Wulin Square is an interchange station between Line 1 and Line 3 of Hangzhou Metro in China. It was opened in November 2012, together with the rest of the stations on Line 1. It is located at Wulin Square in Gongshu District of Hangzhou. The station complex is one of the largest in Hangzhou with a platforms that are wider than regular Hangzhou Metro stations and have provision for a paired cross-platform interchange with Line 3. In addition, the station is connected to a large underground mall.

Station structure
An opposite direction cross-platform interchange is provided between Line 1 and Line 3.

Platform layout
Island Platform on B3

Island Platform on B4

References

Railway stations in Zhejiang
Railway stations in China opened in 2012
Hangzhou Metro stations